Aelurillus aeruginosus is a jumping spider that feeds on ants.

Distribution
A. aeruginosus occurs in the Mediterranean, for example in Sicily, Spain and the Levant (Israel, Syria).

External links
Photography of a feeding female
Drawings of male

Salticidae
Spiders of Europe
Spiders of Asia
Spiders described in 1871